Alawalpur is a small village situated in Baghpat District of Uttar Pradesh, India. It is about 60 km away from the Indian Capital New Delhi. It is known for its constituency Baghpat which is the main working area of RLD.

Administration
Alawalpur is part of the Tehsil  of Baraut. Telephone Code / Std Code: 01234 
Pin Code : 250611 
Post Office Name : Baraut

Alternate Village Name : Allawalpur

Population
Most people in the village speak Hindi .

Geography
The village is in the Time zone IST (UTC+5:30).  Its Elevation is 233 meters above Sea level .

References

Villages in Bagpat district